Entombed is a 1997 album by Swedish metal band Entombed that compiles previously released EPs and several previously unreleased tracks.

Track listing

 Tracks 1–3 taken from the Out of Hand EP
 Tracks 4–6 taken from the Stranger Aeons EP
 Tracks 7–9 taken from the Crawl EP
 Track 10 taken from the split single with The New Bomb Turks
 Track 12 includes a hidden song

References

Entombed (band) albums
1997 compilation albums